Pont-de-Chéruy is a commune in the Isère department in southeastern France.

Geography
Pont-de-Chéruy is located in the department of Isère and in the region of Auvergne-Rhone-Alps, and is an outer suburb of Lyon. The Bourbre flows north through the middle of the commune and crosses the town.

Population
The population has evolved according to the following table:

Health centers and schools 
In 2009 there were 1 medical center and 3 pharmacies.

Since 2009 Pont-de-Chéruy has 2 maternal schools and 1 elementary school, 1 high school and 2 lyceums.

Public and private companies 
Regarding the establishments of services to the population since 2009, there are 1 office of public treasury/tax, 1 unemployment office, 1 police station, 1 post office, various banks, 1 mortuary and multiple private companies of industrial, agricultural, catering and real estate services.

Image gallery

Twin towns
Pont-de-Chéruy is twinned with:

  Livorno Ferraris, Italy, since 2001

See also
Communes of the Isère department

References

Communes of Isère
Isère communes articles needing translation from French Wikipedia